Grand Ayatollah Sadr al-Din bin Saleh (1779–1848) was an Iranian Twelver Shi'a religious scholar belonging to  Sharefeddine and Noureddine families of Lebanese Shia Society.

The as-Sadr Family
Sadr ed-Deen is also the patriarch of the Sadr family, a branch of Sharafeddine family from Jabal Amel in Lebanon. The Sharafeddine family itself is a branch of the Nour eddine family, which traces its lineage to Musa al-Kazim (the seventh Shi'a Imam and through him to the first Imam, Ali ibn Abi Talib and Fatima Zahra, the daughter of Muhammad (died 632). The as-Sadr family has produced numerous Islamic scholars in Iran, Lebanon, and Iraq, including his son Ismail as-Sadr (died 1919/1920) and his grandsons Musa as-Sadr (disappeared in Libya in 1978) and Mohammad Baqir as-Sadr (died 1980).

See also
Ismail al-Sadr
Haydar al-Sadr
Sadr al-Din al-Sadr
Musa al-Sadr
Muhammad Baqir al-Sadr
Muhammad Sadiq al-Sadr
Muhammad Muhammad Sadiq al-Sadr
Muqtada al-Sadr
List of Shi'a Muslim scholars of Islam

References

Iranian ayatollahs
Al-Moussawi family